Paolo Lebas Da Silva (born 20 April 2003), known as Paolo Lebas, is a French professional footballer who plays as a midfielder for  club Ajaccio.

Club career 
On 18 October 2021, Lebas made his debut for Ajaccio as a substitute in a 2–0 Ligue 2 win over Nîmes.

International career 
In May and June 2018, Lebas was called up by the Portugal U15 national team. In December 2018, he received two call-ups; one for the France U16 national team, and another for the Portugal U16 national team. He would eventually join up with France to complete a three-day program at INF Clairefontaine. Lebas would continue to be called up by Portugal until April 2019, when he sufferred an injury that hindered his career.

Personal life 
Lebas was born in France to a French father and Portuguese mother. His brother Victor is also a footballer.

References

External links 
 
 

2003 births
Living people
French people of Portuguese descent
Portuguese people of French descent
Sportspeople from Tourcoing
French footballers
Portuguese footballers
Footballers from Hauts-de-France
Association football midfielders
Ligue 2 players
Championnat National 3 players
AC Ajaccio players